Alaine Chartrand (born March 26, 1996) is a Canadian former competitive figure skater. She is the 2014 Rostelecom Cup bronze medallist, the 2016 CS Autumn Classic  silver medallist, and a two-time Canadian national champion (2016, 2019).

Personal life
Alaine Chartrand was born on March 26, 1996 in Brockville, Ontario. She is the daughter of Heather and John Chartrand, and has a brother, Andrew. She attended Thousand Islands Secondary School, graduating in 2014. 

In 2018, Chartrand began studying as a kinesiology student at York University in Toronto.  The following year she transferred to the University of British Columbia in Vancouver.

Career

Early years 
Chartrand began learning to skate in 1999. Mary Jayne Rashotte became her coach when she was four years old.

2012–2013 season
Chartrand debuted on the ISU Junior Grand Prix series in autumn 2012. After winning the senior bronze medal at the 2013 Canadian Championships, she was sent to the 2013 World Junior Championships in Milan, Italy, where she finished eighth.

2013–2014 season
In 2014, Chartrand ranked fifth at the Canadian Championships and was named in Canada's team to the Four Continents Championships. Making her senior international debut, she placed seventh in Taipei, Taiwan. She then came in fifth at the 2014 World Junior Championships in Sofia, Bulgaria.

2014–2015 season
As of August 2014, Chartrand's coaches included Leonid Birinberg at the Nepean Skating Club in Nepean, Ontario; Michelle Leigh at the Oakville Skating Club in Oakville, Mariposa in Barrie, or Canadian Ice Academy; and Rashotte at the Prescott Figure Skating Club in Prescott. She was also coached by Brian Orser at the Toronto Cricket, Skating and Curling Club in Toronto, Ontario and worked with Gary Beacom on footwork. Chartrand debuted on the senior Grand Prix series at the 2014 Skate Canada International, finishing seventh. At the 2014 Rostelecom Cup, she obtained her first GP medal, bronze, having placed first in the short program and third in the free skate.

Chartrand competed at the 2015 Canadian Championships where she won the silver medal. She was named to Canada's world team and finished in eleventh place at the 2015 World Championships in Shanghai, China, thus securing two spots for Canadian women at the 2016 World Championships. Chartrand closed her season by finishing eleventh at 2015 World Team Trophy where Team Canada finished fourth overall.

2015–2016 season
Chartrand began her season on the ISU Challenger Series, placing 4th at the 2015 Nebelhorn Trophy. Assigned to two Grand Prix events, she finished twelfth at the 2015 Skate America and then 6th at the 2015 Rostelecom Cup. She placed second in both segments at the 2016 Canadian Championships in Halifax, Nova Scotia, and won the gold medal by a margin of four points over Gabrielle Daleman and Kaetlyn Osmond.

At the 2016 Four Continents Championships in Taipei, Chartrand placed seventh in the short, fourteenth in the free, and eleventh overall. She finished seventeenth at the 2016 World Championships in Boston, having ranked seventeenth in both segments.

2016–2017 season
Chartrand began her season with a silver medal behind Mirai Nagasu at the 2016 CS Autumn Classic International, having placed sixth in the short program and first in the free skate. Competing on the Grand Prix series, she finished fifth at the 2016 Skate Canada International and tenth at the 2016 NHK Trophy.

She received the bronze medal at the 2017 Canadian Championships and finished eleventh at the 2017 Four Continents Championships in Gangneung, South Korea. She was coached by Michelle Leigh and Brian Orser in Ottawa and Toronto.

2017–2018 season 
Chartrand decided to train primarily in Oakville, Ontario, coached by Michelle Leigh, and to travel occasionally to Colorado Springs, Colorado, to train under Christy Krall.  Chartrand placed fifth at the 2017 CS Autumn Classic International, and then eleventh at both of her Grand Prix events for the season, Skate Canada International and the NHK Trophy.

Chartrand's greatest disappointment came at the 2018 Canadian Championships, where the Canadian delegation to the 2018 Winter Olympics would be decided, with three spots available for ladies' singles skaters.  She placed ninth in the short program and fourth in the free skate, to finish fourth overall.  Chartrand completed only one of her allowed three combinations in the free skate, and finished only 5.41 points behind bronze medallist Larkyn Austman.  She remarked afterward "I definitely left points out there. I skated better in my practiced this morning than I competed." As a result, she was not selected for the Winter Olympics team.

Chartrand finished her season at the 2018 Four Continents Championships, where she finished eighth.  She would later admit to having avoided coverage of the Olympics, and vacationed in Maui instead.

In June 2018, Chartrand decided to train at the York Region Skating Academy, coached by Tracey Wainman and Grzegorz Filipowski.

2018–2019 season 

Chartrand began the season at the Nebelhorn Trophy, where she finished eighth.  Competing on the Grand Prix in consecutive weeks, she placed ninth at Skate America and eighth at Skate Canada International.

At the 2019 Canadian Championships, Chartrand placed fifth in the short program after an error on her attempted triple Lutz-triple toe loop combination.  She went on to win the free skate, and the title overall, her second.  Speaking afterward, she said "I think just not having those high expectations on myself and just wanting to finish happy has been a different mindset and helps have a good performance."  She was assigned to the Canadian teams for the Four Continents and World Championships.

At Four Continents, Chartrand fared very poorly in the short program, doubling all three of her planned triple jumps and ending up in twenty-first place. Speaking afterward, she said that she had felt "really uncomfortable" on the ice that day.  She finished thirteenth in the free skate, climbing to sixteenth place overall.  Chartrand went on to place twenty-third at the World Championships, and then concluded the season as part of Team Canada at the 2019 World Team Trophy.

After 2018-2019 

On July 4, 2019, Chartrand announced that she would not participate in the fall competitions, and was uncertain about returning to competitive skating.

Skate Canada announced Chartrand's retirement on May 26, 2021. She indicated that while she had considered a return to competition, the onset of the COVID-19 pandemic and other off-ice commitments led to her decision to retire.

Programs

Competitive highlights 
GP: Grand Prix; CS: Challenger Series; JGP: Junior Grand Prix

Detailed results

References

External links 
 

1996 births
Canadian female single skaters
Living people
Sportspeople from Brockville